The World Group Play-offs were four ties which involved the losing nations of the World Group first round and the winning nations of the World Group II. Nations that won their play-off ties entered the 2013 World Group, while losing nations joined the 2013 World Group II.

Ukraine vs. United States

Japan vs. Belgium

Spain vs. Slovakia

Germany vs. Australia

References

See also
Fed Cup structure

World Group Play-offs